Aradan may refer to:
Aradan, Ilam, a village in Ilam Province, Iran
Aradan District, an administrative subdivision of Semnan Province, Iran
Aradan, Iran, capital of Aradan County, Semnan Province, Iran
Aradan County, a county in Semnan Province in Iran
Characters in Lord of the Rings, see Hador#The House of Hador